Worse Things Waiting is a collection of fantasy and horror short stories by author Manly Wade Wellman, with illustrations by Lee Brown Coye.  It was released in 1973 by Carcosa in an edition of 2,867 copies, of which 536 pre-ordered copies were signed by the author and artist.  Many of the stories originally appeared in the magazines Weird Tales, Strange Stories, Unknown, and Fantasy and Science Fiction.

Awards
1975, World Fantasy Award, Best Collection/Anthology.

Contents
Foreword by the author
 "The White Road" (poem)
PAGES FROM A MEMORY BOOK
 "Up Under the Roof"
 "Among Those Present"
 "The Terrible Parchment"
 "Come Into My Parlor"
 "Frogfather"
 "Sin’s Doorway"
 "The Undead Soldier"
GRAY VOICES
 "The Pineys"
 "The Kelpie"
 "Changeling"
 "The Devil Is Not Mocked"
 "For Fear of Little Men"
 "'Where Angels Fear...'"
 "The Witch’s Cat"
 "School for the Unspeakable"
 "Warrior in Darkness"
 "Dhoh"
 "Larroes Catch Meddlers"
THE NIGHT SIDE OF HISTORY
 "Voice in a Veteran’s Ear"
 "These Doth the Lord Hate"
 "The Liers in Wait"
 "Young-Man-With-Skull-At-His-Ear"
 "The Hairy Thunderer"
 "The Song of the Slaves"
 "When It Was Moonlight"
 "His Name on a Bullet"
 "The Valley Was Still"
LONGER IN THE TELLING
 "Fearful Rock"
 "Coven"

Notes

References

1973 short story collections
Horror short story collections
Fantasy short story collections
World Fantasy Award-winning works